Quadflieg is a surname. Notable people with the surname include:

Christian Quadflieg (born 1945), German television actor and director
Will Quadflieg (1914–2003), German actor, father of Christian

Surnames of German origin
Surnames from nicknames